Édouard Mantois  was a French sailor who competed in the 1900 Summer Olympics in Meulan, France. Mantois also took, as crew, the Bronze medal in the first race of the 1 to 2 ton and the 4th place in the second race of the 1 to 2 ton.

Further reading

References

External links

 

French male sailors (sport)
Sailors at the 1900 Summer Olympics – 1 to 2 ton
Olympic sailors of France
Year of birth missing
Year of death missing
Olympic bronze medalists for France
Medalists at the 1900 Summer Olympics
Olympic medalists in sailing
Sailors at the 1900 Summer Olympics – Open class
Place of birth missing
Place of death missing